Gedling is a village in the Gedling district, in Nottinghamshire, England, four miles northeast of Nottingham city centre. The population at the 2011 census of the ward was 6,817 and 111,787 for the district. Gedling was recorded in the Domesday Book and is still a distinct settlement, although residential, commercial and industrial growth in the wider borough of Gedling and the neighbouring city of Nottingham, boroughs of Broxtowe and Rushcliffe and district of Ashfield (as well as the Derbyshire boroughs of Amber Valley and Erewash, which have become increasingly urban around Nottingham) means it can be difficult to distinguish the village of Gedling from the nearby town of Carlton, with which it has become contiguous.

History

Gedling was first settled around Saxon times, when the Saxon chief Gedl (hence the name Gedling, coming from the chief "Gedl" and "Ing" being Saxon for People, Gedl-Ing meaning "Gedl's People") sailed up the River Trent, and then up the Little Ouse dyke, until he could get no further upstream.  He landed at the spot which is thought to be the present-day site of All Saints' Church. Gedling has had several versions of its name including Ghellinge, Gedlinga, Geddlings, and Gettang.

Despite being a fairly small place, Gedling gives its name to the local borough council which has its offices in nearby Arnold, and also to the local parliamentary constituency, which covers the suburbs to the east of Nottingham, including Arnold and Carlton. Village pubs are the Gedling Inn (once the Chesterfield Arms) and The Willowbrook on Main Road.

Church
In the older part of Gedling is All Hallows' Anglican Church. It dates from the 11th century, with the oldest part of the church (the entrance) dating back to 1089 – although there have been four other churches on this site, the oldest dating back to the year 678AD.

Colliery
Gedling Colliery, which was the life-blood of Gedling and many of the surrounding villages, opened in 1899 and was closed in 1991. One hundred and twenty-eight men died at the colliery, which produced over a million tonnes of coal per year in the 1960s. It developed a reputation as the "pit of all nations" because of the diversity of foreign miners who worked there: in the 1960s, 10 per cent of the colliery's workforce of 1,400 were originally from the Caribbean.

The site was opened as Gedling Country Park on 28 March 2015.

Country park
Opened in March 2015 on the site of the former Gedling Colliery, the site has views of Gedling, and from its highest point there are views across Nottinghamshire and into neighbouring Lincolnshire and Leicestershire. On a clear day it is possible to see as far as Belvoir Castle and Lincoln Cathedral. There are a number of paths that weave their way through the woodlands and grasslands that make up the flora and fauna within the country park.

Railway station
There are plans to either reopen the railway line from Nottingham railway station and to reopen Gedling railway station which was closed on 4 April 1960, or to open the old line as a part of the Mineral Line cycleway. The original station building is now owned by a youth group. The line itself officially closed in 1995 when the line to the colliery eventually was classed as redundant.

Education
The local school is the Carlton le Willows Academy, Wood Lane, Gedling for 11-to-18 year olds.
The Gedling School closed to pupils in 2016 after becoming an Academy.

Shopping
There is a Sainsbury's Local convenience store on Arnold Lane and a Co-operative supermarket on Gedling Road.

Media
Gedling borough has its own dedicated hyperlocal news website called Gedling Eye, which has been publishing local news on a daily basis since 2015.

Bus services

Nottingham City Transport
24: Nottingham, Carlton Hill, Westdale Lane.
25: Nottingham, Carlton Hill, Westdale Lane, Mapperley, Daybrook, Arnold.
25B: Nottingham, Carlton Hill, Westdale Lane, Mapperley.
26: Nottingham, Carlton Hill, Gedling, Carlton-le-Willows, Burton Joyce, Lowdham.
N26: Nottingham, Colwick, Netherfield, Gedling, Burton Joyce, Lowdham, Southwell.
N27: Nottingham, Sneinton, Carlton Hill, Westdale Lane, Gedling, Mapperley, Woodborough Road.
44: Nottingham, Sneinton Hermitage, Colwick, Netherfield, Gedling.
44A: Nottingham, Sneinton Hermitage, Colwick Industrial Estate, Netherfield, Gedling.
45: Nottingham, Woodborough Road, Mapperley, Westdale Lane, Gedling.

Nottingham Community Transport (CT4N)
L74: Victoria Retail Park, Netherfield, Cavendish Road, Westdale Lane, Adbolton Avenue, Jessops Lane, Carlton Square, Netherfield, Victoria Retail Park.
L75: Victoria Retail Park, Netherfield, Emerys Road, Stoke Bardolph, Burton Joyce, Foxhill Road.

References

External links

Gedling Borough Council 
History of Gedling (background music)
Gedling – A History
Friends of Gedling Country Park
Gedling Eye

 
Villages in Nottinghamshire